Mutayevo (Motay) is a rural locality (a village) in Saryshevsky Selsoviet, Meleuzovsky District, Bashkortostan, Russia. The population was 153 as of 2010. There are three streets.

Geography 
Mutayevo is located 41 km east of Meleuz (the district's administrative centre) by road. Narbutovo is the nearest rural locality.

References 

Rural localities in Meleuzovsky District